Nathan Dewayne Jones Jr. (born December 30, 1985) is a former American football wide receiver in the National Football League who played for the St. Louis Rams. He played college football for the Texas Longhorns.

References

1985 births
Living people
American football wide receivers
St. Louis Rams players
Texas Longhorns football players